Albanian comics, though not well known internationally, were produced mainly by comic-authors from Kosovo. Until recently there was no comic tradition in Albania where comics were seen as junk literature known as fumeti (literally, little clouds of smoke) supposedly because pop art was prohibited by the dictatorial communist regime. Today there is one comic magazine published in Kosovo called Leon, and there is Tafë Kusuri comic-strip (oldest serial character founded by Agim Qena, and continued by his son Rron Qena) together with Garfield and Calvin and Hobbes (translated in Albanian) published by Koha Ditore newspaper.

Brief history
In Kosovo comic culture was influenced most notably by the subculture in Yugoslavia, although other countries had influence. The first comic-strip published in Kosovo was Tafë Kusuri by Agim Qena (Rilindja newspaper). There was also an Albanian comic magazine published in Pristina, Kosovo during the nineties parallel governance, and it was called Strip Arti. It featured comics created by local and international authors. The magazine was discontinued for the lack of founding. Without "Strip Arti" the comic culture had continued mainly through children and teenager magazines. A magazine dedicated to alternative arts Hapi Alternativ, edited by comics fan Petrit Selimi, published local and foreign comics as well, introducing novel characters such as Hellboy to the Albanian language market. Another mixed content magazine was Hareja (published monthly during the nineties by Ibrahim Kadriu) and a weekly children's supplement in Koha Ditore called Vizatori (published 2000–2005 by Yll Rugova). Printing house "Rrota" published and translated Spiderman, Alan Ford and X-Men during 2003. Later they published a monthly children's magazine called Pishpiriku where a five-page comic (written and illustrated by Trembelat) was regularly featured. 
Daily Zeri in 1999 also published original works, and weekly Java in 2003 published Rrotelat (by Edon Muhaxheri), though both have discontinued the practice.

In colloquial Albanian comics are called "stripa", showing the influence of Yugoslav comic-culture.

Comics are difficult to find to buy in Kosovo. Some of them are found in distribution points of Rilindja newspapers, while fans can also find limited copies in comics-inspired coffeeshop in downtown Prishtina named Stripdepot as well as Dit' e Nat' bookshop-cafe.

Authors
Main comic authors in Kosovo: Agim Qena, Shpend Kada, Binjamen Haxha, Valdet Gashi, Gjon Marku, Gani Sunduri, Gani Jakupi Ramadan ZapluzhaFahri Axhanela .
Main comic authors in Albania: Shpend Bengu.
Main comic publishers in Kosovo; Rilindja, Rrota, Hareja, Hapi Alternativ, Koha

Facts
 There is a cafe-bar in Pristina called Strip Depot that has a collection of comic books where people can read and buy. The comic-inspired bar was founded by Petrit Selimi, a comic enthusiast and former publisher of comic magazine Hapi Alternativ.
 During 1997-1998 period there was a one-year comic school organised and founded by Soros Foundation. It was discontinued because of the Kosovo war.

See also
 Albanian art
 Albanian music

References

External links
 "Rrota" publishing house
 trembelat.com
 Koha Ditore Online
 Kosovo at Macedonian Comics Center
 Strip Depot Cafe
 Comic strip association Kosova
 Shpend Bengu

Albanian art